John Jacob Frank Pennink (1913–1983) was a British amateur golfer, sports journalist and golf course architect.

Life

John Jacob Frank Pennink was born in Delft, Netherlands in 1913.
His father was keenly involved in sports, as was Frank.
He went to Tonbridge School, Kent, an independent boys' school.
He played in this school's cricket first eleven in a match against Clifton College at Lord's Cricket Ground.
He attended Magdalen College, Oxford University, and played on the university golf team  from 1933 to 1935.
He was team captain in 1935.

After graduating from university Pennink became an employee of an insurance company based in the City of London, but continued to play golf as an amateur.
In 1937 he won the English Amateur, the Royal St George's Gold Vase and the South of England Amateur.
That year the English Amateur was held at Saunton Golf Club.
He won the English Amateur again in 1938.
The match was played at Moortown Golf Club and was decided by a 19th hole.
He played with Leonard Crawley in the winning British team in the Walker Cup in 1938.

During  World War II (1939–1945)  he joined the Royal Air Force and became a squadron leader.
After being discharged he worked as a journalist covering golf for the Sunday Express and then for the Daily Mail.
He published Golfer’s Companion in 1962.

Pennink joined Charles Kenneth Cotton and Charles Lawrie in 1954 to create  Cotton, Pennink and Partners Ltd., a golf course architecture company.
Donald Steel joined the company later.
Pennink worked on many British golf courses, and designed courses in Europe and the Far East.
As an architect Pennick was known for simple but effective greens, often on plateaus surrounded by steep run-offs, and limited use of bunkers on the fairways.
A characteristic feature was a tree planted in the middle of the fairway.
Some of his most acclaimed courses were the Olgiata Golf Club in Italy, which he designed with Ken Cotton in 1961, the Oceanico's Old Course of 1969, the Lisbon Aroeira I of 1972, Palmares in 1975, Oceanico's Pinhal in Portugal in 1976 and the Noordwijk Golf Club in Holland.

In 1967 Pennink became president of the English Golf Union.
For several years he was a selector for the Walker Cup team.
He died of cancer in 1983.

Notable courses

Notable courses designed by Pennink in Europe included the Vilamoura Old Course, Vilamoura, Algarve, Portugal, which opened in 1969. 
The Old Course has a parkland style, and meanders over gently rolling terrain through large pine trees. It has been called the Grande Dame of Algarve courses. 
In 1996 Martin Hawtree undertook a major renovation of the course, but did not change the layout.
Originally the Oceanico's Old Course and now called the Dom Pedro Old Course, it is a classic of the English style of course.
Pennink also designed the Dom Dedro Pinhal in the Algarve. 
It was renovated in 1985 by Robert Trent Jones.
He designed the course for the Royal Country Club de Tanger in Tangier, Morocco.

Other European courses included:

 Clube de Campo da Aroeira I & II, Charneca de Caparica, Portugal 
 Drentse Golfclub 'de Gelpenberg', Aalden, Netherlands 
 Golf Club Castell' Arquato, Castell'Arquato, Italy
 Golfclub de Haar, Vleuten, Netherlands 
 Golfclub Ostfriesland e.V., Wiesmoor, Germany
 Golf de Nantes, Vigneux-de-Bretagne, France
 Kokkedal Golfklub, Hørsholm, Denmark
 Noordwijkse Golf Club, Noordwijk, Netherlands.
 Osnabrücker Golf Club e.V., Bissendorf-Jeggen, Germany 
 Palmares Club, Meia Praia, Lagos, Portugal.
 Stora Lundby Golfklubb, Gråbo, Sweden 

Courses in Britain included:

 Conwy Golf Club
 Frilford Heath Golf Club – Red Course
 Ganton Golf Club, Scarborough, North Yorkshire, UK
 Goswick Golf Club (Berwick Upon Tweed Golf Club)
 Gullane Golf Club 2
 Lamberhurst Golf Club, Lamberhurst, Kent, UK
 Littlestone Golf Club – Championship Links
 Royal Aberdeen Golf Club – Balgownie Course
 Royal Cromer Golf Club
 Royal Liverpool Golf Club (Hoylake)
 Royal Lytham & St Annes Golf Club
 Royal St George's Golf Club
 Royal Wimbledon Golf Club
 Saunton Golf Club West Course
 Seaton Carew Golf Club (Durham & Yorkshire Club)
 Tewkesbury Park, Tewkesbury, Gloucestershire, UK
 Woburn Golf Club – Duchess’ and Duke's

Publications

Notes

Sources

1913 births
1983 deaths
British male golfers
People from Delft
People from Forest Row